Blepharotes aterrimus is a species of assassin fly native to Indonesia.

See also
 List of Asilidae species

References

Asilidae
Insects described in 1907
Insects of Indonesia